This article lists a selection of notable works created by Camille Claudel. The listing follows the 2005 book Camille Claudel.

Sculptures

Museums
J. Paul Getty Museum, Los Angeles
Musée Camille Claudel, Nogent-sur-Seine
Musée d'Art et d'Histoire (Geneva)
Musée des Augustins, Toulouse
Musée d'Orsay, Paris
Musée Ingres Bourdelle, Montauban
Musée Rodin, Paris
Museo Soumaya, Mexico City
La Piscine Museum, Roubaix
Palais des beaux-arts de Lille

Media
Bronze
Marble
Onyx
Plaster
Terracotta

See also
 Sakuntala (1888)
 Bust of Auguste Rodin (1888–1889)
 The Waltz (1883–1905)
 The Mature Age (1894–1900)
 Perseus and the Gorgon (1902)

Notes

References

External links
 Camille Claudel in Google Arts & Culture